Stanisław Sedlaczek (31 January 1892 – 3 August 1941), born in Kołomyja, in what is now Ukraine, was a Polish professor and scoutmaster. One of the organizers of pre-war Sokół troops among university students, he founded the underground resistance scouting organisation "Hufce Polskie" during World War II.

Sedlaczek was arrested and sent to the German concentration camp of Auschwitz, where he was murdered in 1941.

References 

1892 births
1941 deaths
People from Kolomyia
Association of the Polish Youth "Zet" members
Polish resistance members of World War II
Polish Scouts and Guides
University of Warsaw alumni
Polish people who died in Auschwitz concentration camp
Polish military personnel of World War II
Resistance members who died in Nazi concentration camps
Members of the Polish Gymnastic Society "Sokół"